Proguithera inexpectata is thread-legged bug known from Afghanistan. The holotype was collected in Nuristan in 1963. It is the only known species of the Guithera–Lutevula group in the Palaearctic Region.

References

Reduviidae
Hemiptera of Asia
Insects described in 2004